Shahensha Ansari (born 23 December 1981) is an Indian footballer who plays as a midfielder for Sikkim Premier Division League club Sikkim Aakraman.

Club career
Born in Sikkim, Ansari was part of the Sikkim side that participated in the Santosh Trophy in 2004. In 2012, Ansari would join I-League 2nd Division side United Sikkim. He would help United Sikkim earn promotion to the top tier I-League for the next season. He made his professional debut for the club on 20 September 2012 against Pune in the Federation Cup. He came on as a substitute for Shabbir Ali as United Sikkim lost 0–1. Ansari then made his debut in the I-League on 6 October 2012 against Salgaocar. He came off the bench again for Raju Debnath as United Sikkim won 3–2.

After one season, United Sikkim were relegated and Ansari continued playing for the club in the I-League 2nd Division.

In 2015, Ansari moved to Gangtok Himalayan who would also participate in the I-League 2nd Division.

Ansari then joined Sikkim Aakraman in the local Sikkim Premier Division League where he played for the club in 2017 and continued to do so in 2019.

Career statistics

Club

Honours
United Sikkim
I-League 2nd Division: 2012

References

1981 births
Living people
People from Sikkim
Indian footballers
Association football forwards
United Sikkim F.C. players
I-League 2nd Division players
I-League players
Footballers from Sikkim